Gekko guishanicus is a species of gecko. It is endemic to Guishan Island.

References

Gekko
Endemic fauna of Taiwan
Reptiles of Taiwan
Reptiles described in 2016